The 1975 European Women's Artistic Gymnastics Championships took place in Skien, Norway. It was the 10th edition of the competition, which started in 1957. This was Nadia Comăneci's international breakthrough.

Medalists

Results

All-around

Vault

Uneven bars

Balance beam

Floor

References

External links 
Results

1975
1975
International sports competitions hosted by Norway
Gymnastics competitions in Norway
1975 in Norwegian sport
Euro